The Ankasar mine is a large copper mine located in the south-east of Armenia in Syunik Province. Ankasar represents one of the largest copper reserve in Armenia and in the world having estimated reserves of 1.2 billion tonnes of ore grading 0.49% copper and 0.2% molybdenum.

References 

Copper mines in Armenia